Ali Hussain Faris (born 1957) is an Iraqi wrestler. He competed at the 1980 Summer Olympics and the 1984 Summer Olympics.

References

1957 births
Living people
Iraqi male sport wrestlers
Olympic wrestlers of Iraq
Wrestlers at the 1980 Summer Olympics
Wrestlers at the 1984 Summer Olympics
Place of birth missing (living people)
Wrestlers at the 1978 Asian Games
Wrestlers at the 1986 Asian Games
Asian Games competitors for Iraq